Craig Foster (born 7 September 1991) is a Jamaican international footballer, who plays as a striker, most recently for Santa Tecla.

Youth career

Foster played in the Dacosta Cup for the Manning's School in Jamaica.

Club career

In 2010, Foster became a regular for Reno F.C. in the DPL.  As January 2011, he is one of the top 5 goalscorers in the 2010/2011 DPL season.
Foster finished the 2010/2011 DPL with 15 goals in his first season in the top flight. Foster was named league MVP while finishing 2nd in the race for the Golden Boot. Foster signed with Motala AIF during the summer of 2011.  Foster returned to Reno at the end of the 2012 RSPL Season. He then returned to Motala AIF for the 2012 Swedish season. Foster played for IFK Mariehamn in 2013. In 2014, Foster once again featured for Reno F.C. and lead them to the 2014 title.

Harrisburg City Islanders 
In July 2015, Foster was loaned to USL side Harrisburg City Islanders for the remainder of the 2015 season. Foster scored in his debut for the Islanders against New York Red Bulls II on 12 July 2015. Ahead of the 2016 season, Foster's loan option was exercised bringing him permanently on the Islanders roster.

In January 2017, Foster rejoined FC Reno.

In January 2018, Foster transferred to Humble Lions F.C. in the RSPL. He scored 2 goals in his first three games at his new club.

Universidad SC 
Craig Foster began his Central America career in Guatemala, joining Universidad SC in January 2019.

AD Chalatenango 
He transferred to AD Chalatenango in July 2019, going on to score 10 goals in 18 matches during the Apertura 2019.

A.D. Municipal Pérez Zeledón 
Craig Foster joined A.D. Municipal Pérez Zeledón in January 2020.

AD Chalatenango 
He returned to Chalatenango in January 2021.

International career 
In 2010, he led Jamaica U20 national team to the 2011 CONCACAF Finals scoring eight goals during qualifying.

Style of play 
Foster is a fast, strong, and energetic forward, who is known for his accurate finishing ability with both feet. A powerful and prolific goalscorer with good technique, composure in front of goal, and an ability to play off other forwards, Foster is primarily deployed as a central striker.

Honours

Reno
Western Confederation Super League:
Winner (2): 2010, 2014

Individual
Jamaica National Premier League MVP: 1
 2010–2011

External links

1991 births
Living people
Jamaican footballers
Jamaica under-20 international footballers
Jamaican expatriate footballers
Motala AIF players
IFK Mariehamn players
Penn FC players
Ettan Fotboll players
Veikkausliiga players
USL Championship players
Expatriate footballers in Sweden
Expatriate footballers in Finland
Expatriate soccer players in the United States
2014 Caribbean Cup players
Kotkan Työväen Palloilijat players
Association football forwards